Mount Balinhard is a summit in Alberta, Canada.

Mount Balinhard was named for a title bestowed on the Earl of Southesk.

References

Balinhard
Alberta's Rockies